The 2010 Idaho gubernatorial election was held on Tuesday, November 2, 2010 to elect the Governor of Idaho. Incumbent Republican Governor Butch Otter won re-election, defeating his Democratic opponent Keith G. Allred.

A former Lieutenant Governor and U.S. Representative, Otter won an open seat race in 2006 against Democratic Party nominee Jerry Brady with 52.67% of the vote.

Republican primary

Candidates
 Walt Bayes, perennial candidate
 Fred Nichols
Butch Otter, Governor of Idaho
 Pete Peterson (endorsed independent candidate Jana Kemp, but still filed for the primary)
 Rex Rammell, veterinarian, conservative activist and independent candidate for the U.S. Senate in 2008
 Sharon Ullman, Ada County Commissioner
 Tamara Wells

Campaign
Both Rammell and Ullman sought support from followers of the Tea Party movement by criticizing Otter's 2009 attempt to raise Idaho's gas tax.

In August 2009, Rammell drew criticism for joking about buying a license to hunt President Barack Obama.

Polling

Results

Democratic primary

Candidates

Declared
 Keith G. Allred, activist and mediator
 Lee Chaney, laborer

Declined
 Jerry Brady, nominee for governor in 2002 and 2006

Results

Third party candidates

Libertarian Party
Ted Dunlap

Independents
Jana Kemp, former Republican State Representative
Pro-Life (formerly known as Marvin Richardson), organic strawberry farmer, Constitution Party nominee for governor in 2006 and candidate for the U.S. Senate in 2008

General election

Campaign
Between January 1 and May 9, 2010, Allred led Otter in fundraising, having raised $241,000 to Otter's $193,000. Allred said, "We are picking up momentum and are right where we want to be." However, Otter limited his fundraising activity while the Idaho Legislature was in session.

Allred has criticized Otter for backing cuts to public education spending, which led the Idaho Association of Commerce and Industry to launch a website attacking Allred.

Predictions

Polling

Results

References

External links
Idaho Office of Elections 
Idaho Governor Candidates at Project Vote Smart 
Campaign contributions for 2010 Idaho Governor from Follow the Money
Idaho Governor 2010 from OurCampaigns.com
2010 Idaho Gubernatorial General Election graph of multiple polls from Pollster.com
Election 2010: Idaho Governor from Rasmussen Reports
2010 Idaho Governor Race: Otter vs. Allred from Real Clear Politics
2010 Idaho Governor's Race from CQ Politics
Race Profile in The New York Times
Official campaign websites (Archived)
Butch Otter for Re-election
Rex Rammell for Governor
Keith Allred for Governor

2010
Governor
2010 United States gubernatorial elections